

E